Shubenacadie Grand Lake is a large Canadian lake straddling the  Halifax Regional Municipality and Hants county on mainland Nova Scotia.

It drains into the Shubenacadie River at its northeastern outlet.

The lake is the seventh and largest lake in the Shubenacadie Canal system and is located between Lock 5 and 6.

Shubenacadie Grand Lake hosts two provincial parks, Laurie Provincial Park and Oakfield Provincial Park, both on its eastern shore.

A blue-green algae advisory is now associated with Shubenacadie Grand Lake.

References

 Soil & Water Conservation Society of Metro Halifax

Lakes of Nova Scotia
Landforms of Halifax, Nova Scotia
Landforms of Hants County, Nova Scotia
Landforms of Halifax County, Nova Scotia